The Ramon Llull Award is an honor awarded annually by the  to persons or entities of the Balearic Islands that have excelled in any field. It was established in 1997 by Decree 3/2014.

Winners

1997

References

External links

  

1997 establishments in Spain
Awards established in 1997
Balearic culture
Spanish awards